Dana Strum (born Dana Strumwasser on December 13, 1957) is an American musician whose career spans over 45 years. He is best known as a co-founder, bass player, and one of the two primary songwriters of the US-based hard rock band Slaughter, an American Music Awards winner, formed in 1988. He first achieved fame as a member of an ex-Kiss guitarist act, Vinnie Vincent Invasion, along with his future Slaughter bandmate Mark Slaughter.

Strum, who was in Los Angeles at the time, developed a reputation for finding new talented musicians, claiming responsibility for introducing the legendary guitarist Randy Rhoads to Ozzy Osbourne, as well as bringing Jake E. Lee to Ozzy's solo band following Rhoads's tragic death.

Throughout his career, from mid-80s to the present day, Dana Strum has worked with a number of artists and groups, playing bass, co-writing, and/or producing songs, such as The Beach Boys, Détente, Sweet Savage, Ace Frehley, Kik Tracee, Dennis Bono, Vince Neil, and Ozzy Osbourne, among others.

Early life 
Strum, whose family came from Trinidad, British West Indies, was born in Washington, D.C. He spent his childhood in Pasadena, California. His father was a scientist, a pioneer in the field of neurobiology as well as a professor and researcher of psychiatry and neuroscience. His findings continue to be cited today. Strum's mother was instrumental in creating cling-free nylon.

Dana Strum began playing bass guitar at the age of eight despite his parents' disapproval. Growing up in Los Angeles during his teenage years, his playing was influenced by rock performers such as Black Sabbath and Grand Funk Railroad. His first concert was a Black Sabbath/Captain Beyond gig in Hollywood, California.

Strum has been professionally playing bass and used to perform on the Los Angeles Club Circuit since the age of sixteen.

Music career

1976–1979: BadAxe 
Dana Strum began his career in the late 1970s as a member of the progressive hard rock band BadAxe in Los Angeles, California. The band performed on the LA Circuit Scene alongside future successful acts such as Van Halen and Quiet Riot. BadAxe gained attention for their sound, which was similar to that of bands like Black Sabbath and Deep Purple.

In November 1976, BadAxe recorded an album at Stronghold Studios with Strum also serving as producer. A limited number of test pressings of the album were released by Earth Breeze Productions. The following year, the band recorded the single "Cry For Me" / "All You Can Stand" at Dalton Studios in Santa Monica, CA with Strum also co-producing.

Strum left BadAxe in the summer of 1979 when he was offered the opportunity to audition for Ozzy Osbourne and become his new bass player. Osbourne was looking to form a new band following his split from Black Sabbath. Strum is credited with introducing Randy Rhoads to Osbourne at that time.

1981–1983: Modern Design 
In the early 1980s, Strum joined the group Modern Design, which consisted of Ron Mancuso on guitar, Louie Merlino on vocals, and Joey DePompeis on drums. According to Mancuso in an interview from 2010, the band had significant interest from well-known producers and engineers. Modern Design began working with Pasha Records, a label that at the time was releasing records for The Beach Boys and Vanilla Fudge, among others. Despite being close to securing a record deal with multiple labels, it ultimately fell through.

In January 1983, while still a member of Modern Design, Strum held auditions for Ozzy Osbourne, who was searching for a replacement guitar player following the death of Randy Rhoads in a plane crash in March 1982. Jake E. Lee, lead guitarist for the band Rough Cutt, was ultimately chosen for the position, beating out George Lynch, the former guitar player for Xciter and The Boyz.

1983–1985: Danny Spanos 
While working at Pasha Records, Dana Strum along with other members of Modern Design joined forces with Danny Spanos, a former drummer known for his distinctive vocals, who was also recording at the studio. In late November 1983, they opened for Cheap Trick in Kiel Opera House, St. Louis, MO, and the performance was recorded live for the RKO Radio Network. The band's album Looks Like Trouble was produced by Spencer Proffer and released in 1984. Strum also contributed to the album as a writer on the tracks "Good Girl" and "Looks Like Trouble".

1985–1988: Vinnie Vincent Invasion 
In 1985, Strum joined former Kiss guitarist Vinnie Vincent to form Vinnie Vincent Invasion. Robert Fleishman, the ex-vocalist for Journey, was hired as their lead singer. Over the next few months, the band went through a process of auditioning drummers until the Houston-born Bobby Rock joined the band in October 1985. Vinnie Vincent Invasion signed an eight album deal with Chrysalis Records.

After releasing their self-titled debut album in 1986, Fleischman left the group. Mark Slaughter, who Strum met while producing Sin, was brought in as the Vinnie Vincent Invasion new lead vocalist. The video "Boys Are Gonna Rock", directed by Jeff Stein, was produced featuring Mark Slaughter as the singer over Fleischman's vocal track. The video received heavy rotation on MTV. At that time, the band's look was entirely over the top glam. Strum spent the next months touring North America with Vinnie Vincent Invasion, opening for acts such as Alice Cooper and Iron Maiden.

All Systems Go, the Vinnie Vincent Invasion's second LP for Chrysalis, was recorded at Cherokee Studios. Strum played a key role as co-producer, arranger, and engineer while recording the band's albums. Bobby Rock stated in an interview that Strum played a producer role to Vinnie Vincent, offering suggestions and direction while tracking solos, and being "an extraordinary engineer when it came to "punching in."

All Systems Go, released in May 1988, had a more accessible hard rock sound than their debut album  and the band went on a headlining club tour with a few theaters included. The music video for "That Time of Year" became an MTV hit. In August, the band put out "Love Kills", the title song for the movie A Nightmare on Elm Street 4: The Dream Master. The single was also released as a music video.

Three months after the release of their second album, Vinnie Vincent Invasion played their final concert on August 26, 1988, in Anaheim, California, and it was officially announced that the group had disbanded. In an interview with Circus magazine in late 1988, Mark Slaughter stated that the split was amicable, saying "When we first joined the Invasion, we were told that it would be a group situation, but it gradually changed to the point where we were all sidemen. Vinnie wants to be a guitar hero, we want to be a band."

1988–present: Slaughter

1988–1989: Formation 
Following his departiure from Vinnie Vincent Invasion in August 1988, Dana Strum and Mark Slaughter shared a cramped apartment in Los Angeles with seven other struggling musicians while planning their next move. Strum revealed that despite having similar modes of thought, he and Slaughter were "two distinctly different animals". However, their differences worked to their advantage, and after securing a deal with Chrysalis Records, they wrote songs, often penning lyrics on top of Domino's Pizza boxes at 3 a.m., and held formal auditions for their new band  They sought two individuals who shared their "one for all and all for one" philosophy, had no issues with substance abuse, and were "fan oriented".

Guitarist Tim Kelly joined after meeting Mark Slaughter at a barbecue, while drummer Blas Elias secured his spot after impressing the two in a videotaped audition and playing live in Los Angeles. The band was formed in January 1989.

1989–1992: Breakthrough with Stick It To Ya 
After forming the band, all four members lived together in a small apartment working on songs with a drum machine and four-track. Soon, they entered the Record Plant to start tracking demos. According to Blas Elias, Strum's talent for bringing out the best in people made the recording sessions a "lighthearted" and enjoyable experience.

His skills in the studio helped Slaughter create the band's unique sound with "bluesy feel", a "definite melodic bass", and a "gutsy, nasty attitude", and also achieve their goal of creating songs with an eye towards commercial success on radio and MTV, and playing concert arenas. 

Strum produced the band's debut album, Stick It To Ya, alongside Mark Slaughter. It was recorded at several studios in Los Angeles, California, and was released in January 1990 on Chrysalis Records. 

Stick It To Ya was the first album on the label to be released exclusively on CD and cassette, with a limited number of vinyl copies distributed to select fans and media members. Prior to its release, the band conducted extensive test marketing in multiple cities, including Chicago. 

While describing the idea of the band, Mark Slaughter asserted that it was "to bring emotion back into rock 'n' roll". The four also characterized their music as "very energetic and very raw". "Although our name is Slaughter, take the S off and it's laughter," Strum jokingly stated in an interview, "It's not a thrash group, it's a fun group". "It's a real rock 'n' roll band. That's what we wanted," he added. According to the band, all songs had a true-life meaning. "They're either about something that we went through or something we both perceive a lot of people go through but can't get a chance to express for themselves," Strum explained.

Critical reception was positive, with major outlets calling the album "a smart, sassy pop-metal effort", "full of musical talent and is definitely one of the finer tastes of metal today", also adding that "with their first hit single, Slaughter is on their way to stardom with a rapid pace that can't and won't be stopped".

Slaughter's first hit single, "Up All Night", directed by Michael Bay, debuted on Headbangers' Ball and got enough calls to hold down the No 1 spot on Dial-MTV for eight weeks in March and April 1990.

The cover of Stick It to Ya caused some controversy when the record was released. It drew protests from feminist and antiviolence organizations for depicting Lori Carr, then Ratt guitarist Robin Crosby's girlfriend, bound to a carnival wheel of a knife-thrower with blades tossed dangerously close. Responding to the criticism, Strum affirmed that it was not intended to be anti-women. "Actually, that's supposed to be like the wheel of life," he said. "And we wanted it to be us strapped on it. But the record company seemed to think she was better looking than we are, and they're right."

Strum stated that "this group was actually formed at the Record Plant in Los Angeles, rather than by going out and playing the club circuit". Slaughter made their live debut on May 4, 1990. That night the band opened for Kiss on the Hot In The Shade Tour in front of 10,000 people in Lubbock, Texas. The triple rock bill also featured Faster Pussycat. After stepping off stage, the band was awarded a gold record, signifying 500,000 copies sold for the first album.

With the help of heavy airplay Slaughter received on MTV and following support slots to Kiss on their American tour, Stick It To Ya took off and became the band's most commercially successful album that was certified Platinum three months later. It peaked at number 18, during its six-month residency on the Billboard 200 album chart. The band's success was celebrated at DC-3 Restaurant, located on the landing strip of Santa Monica Airport near Los Angeles, keeping with the theme of Slaughter's single and video, Fly To The Angels, which also reached No.1 on MTV.

A follow-up, Stick It Live, a live mini-album, featured five live versions of songs from their debut release, recorded on opening dates with Kiss. The EP, Stick It Live, sold 500,000 copies, certifying Gold. The same year saw the release of Slaughter's first long-form video, titled From The Beginning, which included their very first clips, plus behind-the-scenes filmed on tour with Kiss and in hotel rooms across the country. Ultimately, it was certified Gold.

In August 1990, while still on the road with Kiss, the band participated in the MTV Celebrity Challenge at the Denver Grand Prix along with members of Mötley Crüe, Skid Row and Winger, among others. Dana Strum was fifth in the race that was run as a support event for the featured Indy-car race in the inaugural Denver Grand Prix weekend.

Later, in September 1990, Slaughter had their UK debut performing at Rock City, London's Marquee and the Hippodrome.

By December 1990, all members of Slaughter had moved to Las Vegas, Nevada officially becoming the first internationally recognized hard rock band based in Sin City. The four-piece played their first-ever concert in their hometown of Las Vegas on December 15, 1990. The day before the show, in Los Angeles, the band boarded the MGM Grand Air party plane to Vegas along with nearly 40 radio station contest winners from all over the U.S. Upon landing, the party continued by the Hard Rock Café, where the mayor of Las Vegas proclaimed December 14 Slaughter Rock Band Day and changed the name of Las Vegas Boulevard to Slaughter Boulevard for the day. In addition, the band got the keys to the city. The big homecoming event was covered on national TV.

In January 1991, Slaughter won the American Music Award for Best New Hard Rock/Heavy Metal Artist, and Stick It To Ya album exceeded 2xPlatinum status. To further the band's reach in America, Slaughter shot and released the third music video, Spend My Life, which charted at No.1 on MTV.

Around that time, Slaughter kicked off their first European tour with Cinderella which was canceled that same month because of the Persian Gulf crisis. Instead, they performed a number of free shows on the Poison and Trixter tour. "It sure beats sitting around and doing nothing. The money wasn't in the budget to pay us and tickets were already being sold so we decided to gamble that we'd earn enough in T-shirt sales at the show to cover our expenses," Strum clarified. The band also traveled to New York to tape the MTV Unplugged show, where they played an all-acoustic set, something they had never done before.

From the very beginning, the band was very vocal about the fact that they didn't do drugs. During an interview, Dana Strum maintained: "We've spoken very openly that we don't. A lot of people said that was totally wrong, that's not rock 'n' roll. But I want to be a musician, not a drug addict. I wanted to play music and make people feel good." On March 23, 1991, as part of an effort to raise money for the Miami Coalition for a Drug-Free Community, Slaughter gave a free concert outside of one of the Taco Bell Miami outlets, that was reportedly the band's favorite food at the time. According to Strum, that was "the most ridiculously fun thing" they had done since the formation of the band.

While still on the road with Kiss, the band was approached by Interscope Records to write a song for the movie Bill & Ted's Bogus Journey, starring Keanu Reeves. Although Slaughter was committed to opening Cinderella's tour across North America, Dana Strum and Mark Slaughter wrote the idea in a conference room at a hotel in San Antonio, Texas. A week later they stopped in a studio in Vancouver, Canada to end up tracking the song Shout It Out that would later go Gold. A music video featuring scenes from the movie was made to accompany the single.

1992–1995: Living The Wild Life 
After completing the tour with Cinderella and taking about two weeks off, Slaughter promptly started work on their second studio album. According to Blas Elias, like their first record, the follow-up was written almost the same way in the living room of Mark Slaughter's house with a drum machine, a four-track, a small guitar, and a bass. The band did three sessions of demos before tracking the songs for the record to keep that same great vibe, "making sure nobody was getting tensed up in the studio".

Recording for Slaughter's sophomore studio LP The Wild Life began in October 1991 in the same studio the band tracked their first, The Red Zone in Burbank, California. Tim Kelly remarked in an interview that after playing 300 live shows the band had "become a lighter, leaner, meaner machine". Once again, the drums were recorded at Pasha Records. When asked about the recording of Slaughter's second album, Blas Elias told The Modern Drummer magazine, "Dana grew up there. When he was starting out as an engineer, he was sweeping floors at Pasha and working for [owner] Spencer Proffer, so he knew the studio really well and liked the sound of it. And of course, when you have a good thing, you don't want to change it."

Discussing The Wild Life, Dana Strum and Mark Slaughter inevitably mentioned classic rock giants like Queen, Boston and Journey. While Strum characterized the album as a "harder-edged record", music critics described Slaughter's second studio effort as "over-flowing with quick 'n' catchy riffs, memorable melodies, layers of vocal harmonies, and stretches of sound effects". They also took note of the stylistic similarities with Queen stating that it was "hard to believe that Brian May never walked into Burbank's Red Zone Studio during the four-month period Slaughter recorded The Wild Life".

The Wild Life contained 13 tracks, all of which were again co-produced by Dana Strum and Mark Slaughter. The only song that didn't make it to the disc and cassette was "The Shuffle", which exclusively appeared on Slaughter's second home video released in tandem with the record.

In an interview with Chicago Tribune, Strum proudly stated that Slaughter was "the only self-produced, self-written" new American rock band at the time. He added, "When the fans hear something by Slaughter, they know it's ours." Kelly explained: "Slaughter doesn't try to clump our music into one style. It would be a lie for us to play just one type of music. This record reflects our various influences."

Two months before the official April in-store release date of the album, as part of the most ambitious fan thank-you at the time, Slaughter sent out a six-song demo tape of The Wild Life to a large number of active members of its fan club. Strum later explained that it was their "way of giving the fans something the regular public couldn't get". The cassette had the same cover as the album but was stamped "Slaughter Bootleg Demos". It also featured interviews and comments with the band.

Following the release, The Wild Life album debuted at No.8 on the Billboard album chart in April 1992 and continued the commercial success of Stick It To Ya.Accompanying the album, a home video with the same title, "The Wild Life", was released. It was a 72-minute long documentary of the making of the album, also including profiles of the band members. Later, it became the band's second home video to certify Gold. It featured the title track video as well as videos to "Days Gone By" and the unreleased at the time clip of "Mad About You". In addition, it contained the video of the recording of "Times They Change" that was inspired by Slaughter's European tour during the Gulf War, among others. Describing the documentary, Dana Strum explained that he "wanted to show more than the usual band on the road, in the tour bus, leaving the hotel, signing autographs". "This one walks you through the whole experience of coming off a surprising first record and embarking on the second with a harder direction," he added, "You get to see the writing of "Real Love" and the actual recording of the demo." In fact, all of the music on the home video, except for the finished video clips was Slaughter working on demos.

The controversial cover art for The Wild Life, a 17th-century line drawing that had been used on the cover of Smithsonian Magazine, once again was met with some criticism. It showed a man cracking a whip high over the head of a child who shields himself as he holds a guitar. According to the band, the art was supposed to show the adults of the world trying to oppress the spirit of youth. Guitarist Tim Kelly explained, that they were trying to convey a positive image, not a negative one. "Mark and Blas came from families where they were supported in their musical interests," noted Kelly. "When we saw this picture, we saw Dana and myself as the child who was not supported in his ambitions. This album is dedicated to the kids who have Black Sabbath cranked up to 11 on their stereo, with a chair propped under the door handle and their mother screaming "Turn it down!" Kelly remarked.

The tour in support of the record launched on June 9 in Portland, Oregon, as part of a triple bill with Ozzy Osbourne and Ugly Kid Joe. By July 1992, The Wild Life proved to be another Slaughter's success as it was certified Platinum in the United States. Around this time, the music video for "Real Love" was released and became the band's first world premiere.

Soon, the tour with Osbourne was cut short because of the non-cancerous nodule found in Mark Slaughter's throat. It required surgical attention that was successfully performed in August 1992. But Slaughter's lead singer immediately began "complete vocal rest". "He had to write everything down," Strum stated. By December Mark Slaughter was back behind a microphone as the band performed on the Dick Clark's Halloween Special from Universal Studios in Hollywood, California. The four continued to tour with the Damn Yankees until midway through the 1993 season.

In September 1992, Dana Strum hosted a Rockline show filling in for Bob Coburn, when his special guests were Joe Satriani and his band and Bonham.

After receiving the most media attention for their second CD effort, the band began to make arrangements to work on their next Chrysalis release.

1995–1998: Fear No Evil 
The writing of Fear No Evil, Slaughter's third studio album, in Las Vegas seemed to start out like all other records thus far. Later, the band found a studio in Los Angeles that they really liked. However, they were informed it wasn't available. Instead of looking for another place, they bought the building and all the equipment and named it "Slaughterhouse". Later, when the album was finished, they moved everything out of the building and "it no longer exists".

Meanwhile, in March 1993, midway into writing, guitarist Tim Kelly and then tour manager were arrested in Las Vegas by drug enforcement officials for a six-plus-year-old charge involving narcotics trafficking. From this point, until the record was completed, it was under question if Tim Kelly would ever tour with the band again. A trial was held in Philadelphia where the band testified on behalf of their bandmate and "he got off on all charges". In July, to make matters worse, Strum's dirt bike was struck by a drunk driver within a half-mile of his house in Las Vegas, Nevada, causing 17 broken bones including his left wrist and two fingers on the left hand he plays bass with. He later admitted that if he hadn't been wearing a helmet he'd be dead.

Things began to improve again in December 1993, when the band headed to South America and began 1994 touring, this time as headliners, in the Midwest. Fear No Evil was completed in February 1994, followed by the tour with Damn Yankees that started that same month. By that time, the band's record label, Chrysalis, was sold to EMI. At first, the band saw it as "a very positive thing". Speaking about that management change, Mark Slaughter asserted: "They understand the music we make, and they can expose us to people that like the kind of music we play". However, according to the band, after flying to New York to debut the album for the record company in the middle of the year, they soon discovered that no one involved in the promoting of their early records was any longer employed by Chrysalis (EMI) records. "When they don't know the names of the songs which made you popular," Strum admitted, "you're in trouble." Leaning on his credentials as the band's producer, Strum ended up getting Slaughter out of its record deal, which added another five unproductive months as the band was seeking a new label.

There was interest from five, but Slaughter chose an independent label because Strum thought that "some of the best music was being turned out by the indies". The band signed a deal with then-newcomer, CMC International Records, a North Carolina-based label that supported "American self-written, self-produced rock 'n' roll". According to Strum, "it was definitely a risky decision". "No one knew what was going to happen with CMC at the time, but we were fed up with the corporate thinking of a major label and we liked the hands-on attitude that CMC label president Tom Lipsky seemed to have," he stated. The label also had become the home of '80s hard-rock bands such as Iron Maiden, Warrant, Dokken and L.A. Guns.

After many delays, Fear No Evil was finally released in May 1995, in Europe and Japan. Released as hard rock popularity was on the wane, it failed to have the same commercial impact as its predecessors and received mixed reviews from critics. Fear No Evil was characterized as "not boring", compiled of a mix of traditional Slaughter rockers with "the Cult-meets-Lou Gramm and Foreigner sound" of their first single "Searchin'". "Searchin'" was a stretch from their familiar anthemic rock and the expected power ballad and offered "a good introduction of the more diverse musical style the band is growing into". "It'll Be Alright" was described as having "a sure Beatles sound to it", while "Breakdown N' Cry" was noted as Slaughter's first attempt at the blues. "Unknown Destination", the band's final cut, which Strum called their "most aggressive rocker" was influenced by the days when Strum and Slaughter were in a band that toured with Iron Maiden. "The band has grown as people and as musicians, but we still stay true to our kind of music," Strum stated. The band was finally back.

The band became notorious for their lurid album covers. Once again, they kept with the tradition, and Fear No Evil, similarly, showed a woman being "intimate with a snake". "Rock and roll is supposed to be lived on the edge," Mark Slaughter said in an interview, adding, "So what we figure is let's see how far we can push it with record covers before stores start threatening not to stock them".

In mid-April, in early support of the album, the band embarked on a long, 18-month American tour that showcased their old hits and new music that "certainly expanded Slaughter's boundaries". "We're touring harder now than we used to," Mark Slaughter claimed. They were performing in clubs and theaters across the country six or seven nights a week. "The personable thing is good," Slaughter added, "I think the band has grown immensely from having to do that."

A Slaughter show in 1995 was described by critics as "the intense loud party atmosphere event" it had been in 1990. "We've never run on our fans. We're not a band that's going to shave our heads just because it's popular," reaffirmed Strum. "We want to re-establish old memories and tell new fans to come out and hear who we are. That's our attitude."

Around this time, Slaughter also released "Rain On", a five-song import EP featuring Elton John's "Saturday Nights Alright for Fighting", the band's first cover song. During the tour across America, Slaughter took a month in the late summer of 1995 to embark on their first tour of Japan. According to the band, the tour was a long overdue overwhelming success. In Japan, due to Kelly's ongoing legal problems, Slaughter had to perform with Vince Neil's guitarist Dave Marshall, Tim Kelly's long-time friend.

Meanwhile, to beat Fear No Evil's release date, EMI/Chrysalis released Mass Slaughter, a greatest hits package that wasn't sanctioned by the band. Blas Elias shared in an interview: "In order for us to leave Chrysalis, we had to work out a deal… we are trying to let fans know that Mass Slaughter definitely isn't the project that we are enthused about."

Despite a rough ride through the mid-'90s, Slaughter made it through a turbulent time, coming up with music that was still in the vein of what they wrote in 1990. They hadn't disbanded and had made no personnel changes. Dana Strum asserted: "We were one of the few bands of our genre that has not broken up... never changed our members and never given up." "Our collective decision is to simply make a Slaughter record and not be concerned with passing trends or the business we're in," he added.

1997–1998: Revolution 
Slaughter's fourth studio album, Revolution, was released on CMC International Records in May 1997. Dana Strum and Mark Slaughter wrote all the songs in Nashville, Tennessee, where the band's lead vocalist moved around 1996. Later that same month, the band kicked off a two-month tour to promote the album.

At the time, Revolution was consistent with the band's intent to be pioneers in rock technology. The record was among the first to be an enhanced CD. This allowed the public to not only hear the music but to watch it via CD-Rom. Dana Strum maintained that enhanced CDs were "the wave of the future". "It is the marriage of music, computers and video which to us is the logical next step," he stated, "Today there are only six new releases on enhanced CD, but by the time we put out our next album, I'll bet it will be a common trend."

According to critics, Revolution had a sound, different from the three previous albums. They took note of Mark Slaughter's voice, known for reaching the clouds, was hushed and subdued. The first track, "American Pie", was described as offering boogie-woogie riffs along with "earthy lyrics laced with references to psychedelia". "There are a few different areas we explore," drummer Blas Elias said responding to the criticism. "We always try to do that with every album. There's always going to be the main style that we kind of like and have always done real well with, but we always try to experiment," he added. Nonetheless, with the crossover of alternative rock music in the early '90s, Slaughter, like many other hard-rock bands, struggled to maintain commercial success. In an interview, Blas Elias expressed disappointment over the fact that although some radio stations were giving the album airplay, it was still difficult to get MTV support and radio play.

By this point, the movement toward alternative rock killed many careers for big-hair metal bands, however, Slaughter along with Dokken and Warrant were reliving their glory days opening for Alice Cooper on its first of what would become many package tours. The band toured extensively in an effort to capitalize on the resurgence of interest in the hard rock of the late '80s and pre-grunge '90s. The same year, Slaughter embarked on another package tour, this time with Mötley Crüe singer Vince Neil who had performed with Tim Kelly, Mark Slaughter and Blas Elias at a Las Vegas charity event earlier in the year. Ironically, that's when the band met Jeff Blando, a talented young soundman and guitarist from Orlando, Florida. After the tragic passing of Tim Kelly, he would become the fourth member of Slaughter.

1998–1999: Eternal Live and Rock Never Stops tour 
On February 5, 1998, Slaughter's guitarist, Tim Kelly, was driving on rural road Route 96 in Arizona when an 18-wheeler jack-knifed and collided with his car. He died of injuries in Baghdad, AZ. He was 35.

The terrible news came when Slaughter was compiling tracks for its planned live album for CMC International. The album the band was finishing at the time of Kelly's death, Eternal Live, turned out to be a tribute to the late guitarist. The 12-song collection of live tracks, recorded in late 1997 in Mexico City in front of more than 20,000 fans and hometown Las Vegas, featured some of the last moments on stage for Tim Kelly. "We'd been recording shows for a live album, but when Tim died, we decided that these were the shows we had to use because it was his last times with our fans," Mark Slaughter would later explain. Dana Strum would agree: "And I think he'd be pleased that his last recordings were not just in the studio, but were with our fans there too."

The album was full of memories. Five of the songs on Eternal Live were Top 40 radio tracks, and six of them were No.1 MTV video hits. It also contained Slaughter epics "Up All Night", "The Wild Life", "Mad About You" and their melancholy anthem, "Fly To The Angels". Another enhanced CD from the band, Eternal Live, revealed biographical text and some live concert footage when popped into a CD-Rom drive.

The band members were grieving at the death of the guitar player. Uncertain if the band would continue or tour after Tim's passing, the only logical decision for them to consider was to recruit Jeff Blando, former guitarist for Left For Dead, who had been a friend to Tim Kelly and  had toured with the band the previous summer as a front of house sound technician. "He was just the obvious, logical choice," Strum said of the guitarist who was chosen without an audition. "He knew the vibe, and he and Tim were friends... In fact, Tim was the first guy who came to the rest of us and said, Have you heard this guy play?" "It helped us pad the loss by bringing in another family member," Strum remarked.

The band rehearsed with Jeff Blando during the last week of May 1998 with the only goal in mind to continue and make this work. They were committed to taking part in the Rock Never Stops tour, which began in mid-May and ran through mid-September, on the same bill with bands like Quiet Riot, Warrant, Firehouse and L.A. Guns. "While we were obviously in shock at first, none of us believe he would want anything but to have us keep the upbeat and positive message of Slaughter's music out there in the world," Dana Strum explained, speaking about their decision to continue touring after Tim Kelly's passing. Slaughter's first performance without Kelly was in Salt Lake City in June 1998, as part of the Rock Never Stops tour, with Blando being received by the audience with open arms.

Slaughter continued touring on the Rock Never Stops tour for which Strum came up with the name and concept to showcase bands from the so-called "hair-metal" era. Apart from Slaughter, the tour packaged acts from that scene included Whitesnake, Vince Neil, Warrant, Ratt on single bills, who were playing to as many as 16,000 fans.

1999–2001: Back To Reality 
After overcoming all sorts of obstacles and experimenting a bit on its 1997 release Revolution, Slaughter completed their seventh album, named Back to Reality, symbolizing a return to its trademark style characterized by "crunchy lead guitar and ear-piercing vocals". That marked the first joint writing effort involving all four band members and the most challenging recording schedule to date. With the production of the CD beginning only in March 1999 in Las Vegas, the album was released on June 29, 1999.

In a press release for their new album, Mark Slaughter admitted: "We did stray from our true musical roots on the past couple of albums, but this time we just went in and made a true Slaughter album. This is who we are and who we want to be." Dana Strum seconded that, stating, "That's why we're calling it Back to Reality." "A lot of bands that started in our time felt the pull to sound like the current trends over the past few years and we were no different," he added, "But now we've made an album for us, not for radio stations or anyone else for that matter."

Back To Reality was the band's first recording featuring their new guitar player, Jeff Blando. His style was described as "similar to guitarists such as Randy Rhoads and Zakk Wylde". The album generally received positive reviews from music critics and was described as "a solid entry in the torrent of mainstream rock". It was also noted that, with Jeff Blando filling Kelly's void, "the album screams out of the gate with a pair of adrenaline-pumping rockers, "Killin Time" and "All Fired Up." Another key track is "On My Own," a power ballad that should prove extremely radio accessible".

Slaughter began a supporting tour for the new album, joining Quiet Riot, Night Ranger and headliner Ted Nugent on the Rock Never Stops Tour. Early stops on the tour were witnessed by 8,000 to 12,000 fans per night. Strum remarked: "It's no wonder hard rock music has made a comeback." "The music of all hard rock bands will last the test of time because it has a real positive memory," he stated. "It brings back great, positive feelings. It's supposed to make you feel good, and that's what it does every night."

In an interview, Strum also mentioned that 60 American rock stations were playing his band's new material. "That's five times the amount of airplay we've had in the last four years", he said. Around this time, the band was also scheduled to appear in a VH-1 special Where Are They Now? that was slated for release in the summer of the same year. In September 1999, Slaughter was featured in a major, full-page story in Forbes, marking the increase of the interest from media, when the band did more press interviews, various TV and radio shows than in previous years.

The next year, in October 2000, the band completed a hugely successful 60-city tour with Poison, Cinderella and Dokken, "proving that rock is still alive and well". 2001 was marked by Slaughter taking part in The Voices of Metal tour, which included Vince Neil of Mötley Crüe, Stephen Pearcy's Ratt, and Vixen.

2002 – present 
Although Slaughter has not been much in the headlines in the last 20 years, they never officially disbanded the band. The group took part in a number of tours, mostly in the USA, most of which pair the band up with other classic metal and hard rock groups from the same era. While the band has not released any new studio material since Back To Reality, they maintain their following and continue to tour. The band has performed concert dates each year for the past 32 years in all 50 states and different countries.

In 2003, Slaughter joined headliner Whitesnake on the annual Rock Never Stops tour, also featuring Warrant and Kip Winger, sponsored by VH-1 Classic television. The same year, Capitol records re-released the first two Slaughter CDs Stick it to Ya and The Wild Life, featuring 24-bit digital remastering, additional photos, bonus tracks and liner notes written by Dana Strum and Mark Slaughter.

2004 was marked by the release of a DVD-A titled Then and Now that combined 12 songs and 50 rare photos of the band over the years. Slaughter toured from March to November headlining various venues. In 2005, the band and VH-1 teamed up to release a CD of the band's unplugged called Stripped which kicked off with a sell-out performance in Hollywood, California. The band toured during the year and broke new ground with casino performances and SRO shows.

On March 15, 2006, the VH-1 Stripped DVD hit the retail stores. 2006 was also marked by the release of a DVD that contained live performance footage and band camera footage shots over the years. The band continued touring. In 2007, Slaughter was featured on a compilation CD, Pacific Rim, that became Platinum within its first week of release. The group also filmed many of its live performances for a DVD release. In January, the band joined Vince Neil of Mötley Crüe on a cruise ship playing along with Skid Row and Ratt. It was reported by the band that in 2007 Slaughter's music was played more on radio and the internet than in the three previous years combined.

Slaughter performed in front of 38,000 people at the world-famed Rocklahoma Music Fest in 2008, and later the same year participated in a full summer tour with Vince Neil. In June 2012, they came over to Europe for the first time to take part in the Sweden Rock Festival. According to the band, in 2015, Slaughter, continued to tour extensively and had performed more than 300 shows since 2010 throughout the U.S., Europe, Canada and Japan.

Slaughter has been touring headlining clubs, theaters, casinos, and rock festivals taking an unavoidable break in 2020 due to the then-burgeoning COVID-19 pandemic. In early 2021, Slaughter teamed up with Kiss My Wax Records for a limited reissue of Slaughter's Fear No Evil album featuring the Definitive Edition of a three-LP box set, sold out within weeks, that was signed by the band, and Standard Edition of a two-LP gatefold set. That was the first official pressing of Fear No Evil on vinyl.

2007–present: Vince Neil band 

In 2007, Dana Strum joined Vince Neil's solo band as the bass player. The decision to recruit Strum was made at Jeff Blando's suggestion, who was tasked with assembling a backing band for Neil. Although the idea was innitially met with mixed feelings from the Neil's management team, they eventually agreed to the addition of Strum.The band, which includes Strum on bass, Jeff Blando on guitar and Will Hunt on drums, who later was replaced by Zoltan Chaney, has been touring and playing various venues such as casinos, theaters and music festivals ever since. The band's setlist usually includes a mix of Mötley Crüe songs, songs from Vince Neil's solo albums and some covers.

Strum also co-engineered and played bass on Vince Neil's third solo album, Tattoos & Tequila, released via Frontiers Records and Eleven Seven Music in June 2010. Recorded in the winter of 2009, the album included two new songs: "Tattoos & Tequila" that was also released as a music video, and "Another Bad Day", both produced by Marti Frederiksen (Aerosmith, Ozzy Osbourne, Def Leppard), along with classic rock songs that had influenced Vince Neil throughout his musical career. The cover songs were produced by Neil and Jack Blades (Damn Yankees, Night Ranger).

Talent scout

Randy Rhoads 
In 1978, Dana Strum played bass in the band BadAxe and regularly performed on the LA Club Circuit, sharing the stage with the acts such as Van Halen and Quiet Riot. During this time, he frequently watched Quiet Riot's guitar player, Randy Rhoads, perform. In an interview Strum stated that Rhoads' performances were "extraordinary." In late 1978, Strum approached Rhoads and told him that he believed there was something more out there for him.

In early 1979, Ozzy Osbourne was fired from Black Sabbath and had spent months drinking in a room at Le Parc Hotel in West Hollywood. Attempts were made by Jet Records to convince Osbourne to start a new band. In the summer of 1979, Osbourne attended one of Strum's performances at the Starwood and subsequently offered him an invitation to audition for him, which led to the break up of Strum's band.

Strum was ultimately recruited as Osbourne's new bassist and the two spent time driving around LA to audition prospective guitarists. "He had a list with names and addresses, and we would just show up. It was bizarre," Strum said. They were going to people's garages, and apartments, even ran across George Lynch at some point. Strum suggested Rhoads as the ideal candidate for the band, however, Osbourne did not take his suggestion.

In September 1979, Strum contacted Rhoads frequently to persuade him to audition for a new band that Ozzy Osbourne was forming. Rhoads initially expressed disinterest, but Strum convinced him to audition that same night at Dalton Records in Santa Monica where Strum lived and worked part-time. Rudy Sarzo, Rhoads' bandmate in Quiet Riot, later said that Rhoads was not initially interested in the audition, but agreed to do it simply to get Strum off his back.

When Rhoads arrived at the studio with his old Gibson practice amp, his old six-band equalizer and his Les Paul guitar, Ozzy was stoned and fell asleep. However, Dana Strum, who had booked the studio time and convinced Rhoads to come down to play despite his lack of interest in Black Sabbath, was determined not to let this opportunity pass. He woke Osbourne up, pulled him into a dimly lit control room and made him listen to Rhoads' playing. Initially resistant, Osbourne was willing to "see this Jesus of guitar players." Strum asked Rhoads to play the guitar solo he had performed at the Starwood. Strum said, "It was louder than hell, it sounded huge." Despite Osbourne's initial skeptisism, after listening to Rhoads perform the guitar solo, he immediately offered him the job.

With Rhoads still playing, Strum rushed Ozzy back to his hotel and then returned to tinform the guitarist of the news. After a brief meeting at Osbourne's hotel the following day, where Rhoads reportedly failed to impress Osbourne by drinking Diet Coke and dressing "very extravagantly" a jam session was held at Mars rehearsal studio. The session included Osbourne, Strum and Rhoads and drummer Frankie Banali who was suggested by Rhoads, and was described by Strum as "a pretty wild band." The group rehearsed for approximately one week until Jet Records abruptly sent Strum and Banali home. In a 1986 interview with Metal Mania, Strum reflected on the disappointment of losing a promising collaboration at such a young age stating that the group had potential, but expressed his confidence that Rhoads' talent would lead to great success in the future.

Randy Rhoads recorded two studio albums with Ozzy Osbourne, Blizzard Of Ozz (1980) and Diary Of A Madman (1981). He also toured with Osbourne's band in Europe and North America. Tragically, Rhoads died in a small plane crash on March 19, 1982 in Leesburg, Florida "He was the best guitarist I'd ever seen," Dana Strum said. "It was Randy's sound – along with Eddie Van Halen's – that changed the whole way the next generation of guitar players thought about music. The ones they tried to emulate but never could."

Jake E. Lee 
In January 1983, Strum's connections within the music industry proved instrumental wnen Ozzy Osbourne found himself in need of a guitar player to replace Brad Gillis on tour following the tragic death of Randy Rhoads. He once again turned to Strum, who organized auditions for 10 guitar players who were supposed to be the best in L.A. at that time, including Jake E. Lee, lead guitarist for the band Rough Cutt, and George Lynch, the former guitar player for Xciter and the Boyz.

Although Lynch was initially selected to play on the tour, but, in fact, played only during soundchecks, Osbourne was not completely satisfied with his sound, leading him to request additional auditions. Strum arranged for Mitch Perry and Jake E. Lee to audition with him at S.I.R. studios in Los Angeles, with Lee ultimately being offered the position despite showing up late, not knowing the songs as well as he should have and refusing to do an "off-the-cuff solo" for them. Within days, Jake E. Lee joined Osbourne on tour in Europe and became the first guitarist to play on Osbourne's studio album after Randy Rhoads' passing, featuring on the 1983 album Bark At The Moon. George Lynch was reportedly upset by the decision, with Strum later recalling that Ozzy and Sharon Osbourne favored Jake E. Lee's overall vibe and style.

Style and influences 
Dana Strum was influenced by various musical styles throughout his life. In a 1990 interview with Circus magazine, Strum stated that he attributed the bluesy feel of much of Slaughter's music to his early exposure to R&B music during his childhood in Pasadena, California, the population of which was known to be highly mixed at the time.

Strum's musical inspirations were further shaped as he grew older, and he cited Black Sabbath and Grand Funk Railroad as two bands he played along with as a teenager. He also recalled attending a Black Sabbath/Captain Beyond concert, which he described as a transformative experience. In 2012, Strum acknowledged Black Sabbath's groundbreaking approach to music, stating that "nobody sounds like these people" and that they were "onto something different". He also singled out the Beatles, saying: "I love music. I love the Beatles. Nobody sounds like them, you know. It's so different, so unique, and so interesting." He credited Paul McCartney and Geezer Butler for inspiring him to pursue the bass guitar, stating that without their influence, he may never have become a bassist himself.

In addition to these influences, Strum also acknowledged the heavy impact of Queen on his musical development. He praised the band's innovative approach to creating music, stating, "They changed my life in high school. I went from being totally enthralled with Black Sabbath to Queen, with those distorted guitar sounds and wild arrangements. They really gave me a whole new enthusiasm for music."

Equipment 
Throughout his music career, Strum was widely recognized for playing custom designed V-shape basses that were specifically crafted for him by Arbor Guitars. In a 1988 issue of Circus magazine, it was reported that, Strum used a Korean-made Arbor bass that had been modified with a Badass II bridge as part of his music equipment. Strum described the bass as a neck-through-the-body model with a maple fretboard and having a single Seymour Duncan vintage single-coil pickup wired directly into a 500K potentiometer with no tone circuit, stating that it was "a simple bass."

In addition, Strum owned two more Arbors at the time — one with a Jackson passive pickup, the other with an EMG active single coil — and a mid '70s Black Fender Precision that he used in the studio. Strum revealed that the Fender Prcision still had its stock pickups, stating that it was the only bass that he had ever recorded with. He also preferred to use Dean Markley .105 gauge strings, a Sunn Coliseum preamp, two Carvin DC-900 power amps and 1330 Carvin bottoms loaded with Electro-Voice 15L speakers. In recent years, Strum has been using a white Bluesman Vintage custom Superbird bass during his live performances.

Discography

With Slaughter

Other notable contributions

Soundtracks 

Dana Strum also produced and co-wrote the themes for the syndicated radio programs "Rockline" and "Powercuts".

Filmography

Music videos 
{| class="wikitable sortable"
|-
!Year
!Title
!Band/Artist
!Director
!Ref(s)
|-
|1983
|Lie To You For Your Love
|Danny Spanos
|
|
|-
|1986
|Boyz Are Gonna Rock
| rowspan="3" |Vinnie Vincent Invasion
|Jeff Stein
|
|-
| rowspan="2" |1988
|That Time Of Year
|Nigel Dick
|
|-
|Love Kills
|Nigel Dick
|
|-
| rowspan="3" |1990
|Up All Night
| rowspan="9" |Slaughter
|Michael Bay
|
|-
|Fly To The Angels
| rowspan="5" |Charles Randazzo
|
|-
|Spend My Life
|
|-
| rowspan="2" |1991
|Shout It Out
|
|-
|Mad About You
|
|-
| rowspan="3" |1992
|Real Love
|
|-
|The Wild Life
|Tom Calabreze
|
|-
|Days Gone By
| rowspan="2" |Charles Randazzo
|
|-
|1995
|Searchin|
|-
|2010
|Tattoos & Tequila
|Vince Neil|
|
|-
|2019
|Vultures In The Sky
|Detente'''
|Josh Noyes
|
|}

 Documentaries, TV series, and other appearances 

Strum is often falsely credited as the guitar store clerk in the movie Wayne's World'' (1992). In 1993, in Circus magazine he affirmed: "Although I've been told there is an amazing resemblance, the guy in the movie is definitely not me. When they were filming that movie, I was submerged in the studio recording The Wild Life."

References

External links 
 Historical interview with Charles England

1958 births
Guitarists from Washington, D.C.
American rock bass guitarists
American heavy metal musicians
American heavy metal bass guitarists
American male bass guitarists
Glam metal musicians
Living people
American people of German descent
Slaughter (band) members
Vinnie Vincent Invasion members
American male guitarists
20th-century American guitarists